The 1983 Miami Redskins football team was an American football team that represented Miami University in the Mid-American Conference (MAC) during the 1983 NCAA Division I-A football season. In its first season under head coach Tim Rose, the team compiled a 4–7 record (3–5 against MAC opponents), finished in seventh place in the MAC, and were outscored by all opponents by a combined total of 189 to 152.

The team's statistical leaders included Todd Rollins with 1,262 passing yards, Jay Peterson with 842 rushing yards, and Tom Murphy with 610 receiving yards.

Schedule

References

Miami
Miami RedHawks football seasons
Miami Redskins football